The Dublin Senior Hurling Championship is an annual hurling competition organised by the Dublin County Board of the Gaelic Athletic Association (GAA) since 1887 for the top hurling clubs in County Dublin, Ireland.

Sixteen clubs compete. Initially the teams are divided into four groups of four with the group matches being played from April to May with a break to accommodate the All-Ireland Championship and resume during August or September. The group stage is followed by a knock-out phase which takes place during the months of October and November.

Sponsored by Go-Ahead, it is therefore officially known as the Go-Ahead Dublin Senior Hurling Championship.

Since the establishment of the Dublin Senior Hurling Championship in 1887, a total of 26 clubs have won the tournament. Faughs have been the most successful club having won 31 titles.

History

Origins
The game of hurling has been played in Dublin long since before the foundation of the Dublin Senior Hurling Championship and the GAA. According to Irish historian James Ware (1594–1666), it was customary in the 13th century for the inhabitants of Dublin to organise hurling matches on festive days. On Easter Monday 1209, hundreds of Dublin citizens left the safety of the city walls and descended on the woods near Cullenswood, now Ranelagh, for a hurling match. Tragically, the hurlers and spectators were ambushed by rival clans who had come down from the Wicklow Mountains. Over three hundred Dubliners (including women and children) were slaughtered in the 1209 Cullenswood massacre. This day was commemorated by the citizens of Dublin for many centuries afterwards and became known as Black Monday.

Other early written accounts of hurling matches in Dublin include several 18th century newspaper reports. According to these reports, the most popular hurling venues in Dublin at that time were the Crumlin Commons, Irishtown Green and Phoenix Park. One such account recalls a match which took place on the Crumlin Commons in May 1748, where a selection of hurlers from Leinster defeated 20 hurlers from Munster. In a re-match a month later, the Leinster hurlers proved their worth by beating the Munster selection for a second time. Another report describes a hurling match which took place on Irishtown Green in 1757. The game was held between married men and bachelors for a wager of 50 guineas a side. The tradition of a 'married versus singles' hurling match is still staged by many Dublin hurling clubs on St. Stephen's Day. In 1778, police officers dispersed a crowd on Summerhill that had assembled in the fields there every Sunday during the summer for the purpose of playing football and hurling. It is believed that this was the exact spot where Croke Park now stands. According to the Freeman's Journal, in August of 1779, there was a bet between the penny boys of Smithfield, who had arranged a bull bait for the Fifteen Acres, that they would draw a bigger crowd than "the hurlers of the Phoenix Park". An account from 1792 describes a hurling match which took place in Phoenix Park in front of what was described as a vast concourse of spectators. The report claims that the game had to be abandoned before full-time because the spectators forced their way onto the playing ground.

Foundation

The organisation of hurling clubs in Dublin also predates the foundation of the GAA. In 1882, Michael Cusack attended the first meeting of the 'Dublin Hurling Club', formed "for the purpose of taking steps to re-establish the national game of hurling". In September 1883, Cusack began to organise hurling practices in Phoenix Park on Saturday afternoons. The game had long been lost to the city and to most of the remaining parts of the country as well. As a consequence, just four men turned up on that first Saturday. Slowly the numbers grew, with intrigued spectators joining in. Eventually, Cusack had sufficient numbers to found 'Cusack's Academy Hurling Club' which, in turn, led to the establishment of the Metropolitan Hurling Club. Cusack then established a hurling club in his school on Gardiner Place in October 1883. Immediately, the two clubs began to play matches against each other. A report, written by Cusack, records a game played in December 1883: "During the third and fourth quarters the hurling became so fast and furious, the goals were so threatened on the one hand and defended on the other, that spectators expected to be called on after each charge to help the disabled to Steevens Hospital." On Easter Monday 1884, the Metropolitans played Killimor, in Galway. The game had to be stopped on numerous occasions as the two teams were playing to different rules. It was this clash of styles that convinced Cusack that not only did the rules of the games need to be standardised, but that a body must be established to govern Irish sports.

On Saturday, 1 November 1884, the GAA was founded in Hayes' Hotel, Thurles, County Tipperary. Michael Cusack was among the founding members present that day. From then on, Gaelic games adopted a more structured approach and were governed in each county by a separate body known as the county board. The Dublin County Board was set up in 1886 and within a year had organised a hurling competition known today as the Dublin Senior Hurling Championship. In 1887, the first Dublin Senior Hurling Championship was played out and was won by the Metropolitans, previously formed by Cusack in 1883.

Records and statistics
The Dublin Senior Hurling Championship has been contested 124 times since its inception in 1887. The first team to win the tournament was the Metropolitans, who never won the title again. The most successful club in the history of the Dublin Senior Hurling Championship has been Faughs who have won the competition on 31 occasions, their last title captured in 1999. St Vincents, who are the most successful football club in Dublin, are second with a total of 13 titles, their last in 1993. The record for most consecutive titles is held by Commercials, Garda and more recently Ballyboden St Enda's who each secured a five-in-a-row between the years 1895-99, 1925–29 and 2007-2011 respectively.

Ballyboden St Enda's won 5 consecutive titles since 2007 and contested a total of 8 finals in the last 10 years. In 2009, they won the double, claiming both the hurling and football championship. This was the first time that a Dublin club had won the double since St Vincents had achieved it in 1981.

Wins listed by club

No competition: 1888, 1902.

A: Eoghan Ruadhs Hurling Club and St Oliver Plunketts Football Club amalgamated to form St Oliver Plunketts/Eoghan Ruadh GAA in the 1990s.

B: St Columbas Hurling Club and St Agnes Football Club amalgamated to form Crumlin GAA in 1970.

C: Crokes Hurling Club and Kilmacud Football Club amalgamated to form Kilmacud Crokes GAA in 1966.

Finals listed by year

References

External links
 Friends of Dublin Hurling
 The official Dublin GAA website
 The official Leinster GAA website
 The official GAA website

 
 1
The Herald (Ireland)
D